Manilkara hexandra is a tree species in the tribe Sapoteae, in the family Sapotaceae. It is native to much of the Indian subcontinent: Bangladesh, India, and Sri Lanka; Indo-China: Cambodia, Myanmar, Thailand and Vietnam. Its vernacular names vary regionally; for example "Palu",  "Palai"(பாலை) in Tamil or "Rayan" (පලු) in Sinhalese. It is locally known as the Khirni tree in parts of Bangladesh and India. In the Tamil language it is called Ulakkaippaalai or Kanuppaalai.

Manilkara hexandra is a slow-growing but fairly large evergreen species. It grows in tropical and temperate forests. The tree typically attains some 12 to 25 metres tall and one to three metres in trunk circumference. The bark is grayish and rough.

The wood is hard, durable, and heavy; the density is variously reported as ranging from about 0.83 to 1.08 tonnes per cubic metre, partly depending on the degree of drying.  It is used for heavy structural work, gate posts, and big beams. but also is used for turning and carpentry in spite of the difficulties of working with such dense wood.

It is used as rootstock for Manilkara zapota, and its own fruit is edible.

References

hexandra
Plants described in 1795
Trees of China
Trees of the Indian subcontinent
Trees of Indo-China